The Garuli were an ancient Ligurian tribe mentioned by Livy as being subjugated by Rome under consuls Marcus Aemilius Lepidus and Quintus Mucius Scaevola in 175 BCE. (Liv. xli. 19.)  They inhabited the area of Cenisola.

References

Ligures
Tribes conquered by Rome
Tribes conquered by the Roman Republic